Lisbellaw railway station was on the Dundalk and Enniskillen Railway in Northern Ireland.

The Dundalk and Enniskillen Railway opened the station on 16 August 1858.

It closed on 1 October 1957.

Routes

References

Disused railway stations in County Fermanagh
Railway stations opened in 1858
Railway stations closed in 1957
1858 establishments in Ireland
1957 disestablishments in Northern Ireland
Railway stations in Northern Ireland opened in the 19th century